Austria is set to participate in the Eurovision Song Contest 2023 in Liverpool, United Kingdom, having internally selected Teya and Salena to represent the country with the song "Who the Hell Is Edgar?". Teya and Salena were announced as the Austrian entrants to the contest on 31 January 2023, while their song was presented to the public on 8 March 2023.

Background

The Austrian national broadcaster,  (ORF), broadcasts the event within Austria and organises the selection process for the nation's entry. ORF confirmed their intentions to participate at the 2023 Eurovision Song Contest on 9 June 2022. In  and since , ORF has held an internal selection to choose the artist and song to represent Austria at the contest.

Before Eurovision

Internal selection 
Artists were nominated by ORF's Eurovision team, which collaborated with producer Lukas Hillebrand and music expert Eberhard Forcher who worked on the selection of the Austrian entries since , to submit songs to the broadcaster. In November 2022, it was reported by Austrian media that 15 artists, including singers Julian le Play and Slomo, were involved in the selection and that the Austrian entry would be selected by a panel of ORF entertainment editors together with the broadcaster's programme director Stefanie Groiss-Horowitz and entertainment director Alexander Hofer, after several entries had been shortlisted by a previous panel of 25 local and international music industry and Eurovision experts as well as Eurovision fans following a live casting round which took place on 30 October 2022.

On 31 January 2023, ORF announced during the radio show , aired on Ö3, that they had internally selected Teodora Špirić (Teya) and Selina-Maria Edbauer (Salena) to represent Austria in Liverpool. The song "Who the Hell Is Edgar?", written by Teya and Salena together with Ronald Janeček and Pele Loriano at a songwriting camp in the Czech Republic, was presented as the Austrian entry for the contest on 8 March 2023 during .

At Eurovision 
According to Eurovision rules, all nations with the exceptions of the host country and the "Big Five" (France, Germany, Italy, Spain and the United Kingdom) are required to qualify from one of two semi-finals in order to compete for the final; the top ten countries from each semi-final progress to the final. The European Broadcasting Union (EBU) split up the competing countries into six different pots based on voting patterns from previous contests, with countries with favourable voting histories put into the same pot. On 31 January 2023, an allocation draw was held, which placed each country into one of the two semi-finals, and determined which half of the show they would perform in. Austria has been placed into the second semi-final, to be held on 11 May 2023, and has been scheduled to perform in the second half of the show.

References 

2023
Countries in the Eurovision Song Contest 2023
Eurovision